This is a partial list of unnumbered minor planets for principal provisional designations assigned between 16 November and 31 December 2002. , a total of 327 bodies remain unnumbered for this period. Objects for this year are listed on the following pages: A–B · C · D–F · G–K · L–O · P · Qi · Qii · Ri · Rii · S · Ti · Tii · U–V and W–Y. Also see previous and next year.

W 

|- id="2002 WQ" bgcolor=#FFC2E0
| 2 || 2002 WQ || AMO || 18.6 || data-sort-value="0.68" | 680 m || multiple || 2002–2017 || 06 Feb 2017 || 83 || align=left | Disc.: NEAT || 
|- id="2002 WW" bgcolor=#E9E9E9
| 0 || 2002 WW || MBA-M || 17.89 || 1.1 km || multiple || 1998–2021 || 19 Apr 2021 || 111 || align=left | Disc.: NEATAlt.: 2012 DV7 || 
|- id="2002 WZ" bgcolor=#FA8072
| 0 || 2002 WZ || MCA || 19.42 || data-sort-value="0.39" | 390 m || multiple || 2002–2022 || 25 Jan 2022 || 115 || align=left | Disc.: NEAT || 
|- id="2002 WH1" bgcolor=#d6d6d6
| 0 ||  || MBA-O || 17.1 || 2.1 km || multiple || 2002–2020 || 21 Apr 2020 || 74 || align=left | Disc.: NEAT || 
|- id="2002 WX1" bgcolor=#fefefe
| 0 ||  || MBA-I || 17.79 || data-sort-value="0.82" | 820 m || multiple || 2002–2022 || 07 Jan 2022 || 158 || align=left | Disc.: NEAT || 
|- id="2002 WH2" bgcolor=#fefefe
| 3 ||  || MBA-I || 18.5 || data-sort-value="0.59" | 590 m || multiple || 2002–2016 || 06 Dec 2016 || 61 || align=left | Disc.: NEATAlt.: 2009 WP27 || 
|- id="2002 WR3" bgcolor=#d6d6d6
| 0 ||  || MBA-O || 16.52 || 2.8 km || multiple || 2002–2021 || 08 Aug 2021 || 147 || align=left | Disc.: NEAT || 
|- id="2002 WU3" bgcolor=#fefefe
| 0 ||  || MBA-I || 18.71 || data-sort-value="0.54" | 540 m || multiple || 2002–2021 || 15 Apr 2021 || 88 || align=left | Disc.: NEAT || 
|- id="2002 WY4" bgcolor=#d6d6d6
| 0 ||  || MBA-O || 16.15 || 3.3 km || multiple || 2002–2020 || 17 Apr 2020 || 146 || align=left | Disc.: NEAT || 
|- id="2002 WF5" bgcolor=#d6d6d6
| 0 ||  || MBA-O || 16.3 || 3.1 km || multiple || 2002–2021 || 15 Jan 2021 || 145 || align=left | Disc.: NEAT || 
|- id="2002 WO6" bgcolor=#d6d6d6
| 0 ||  || MBA-O || 16.45 || 2.9 km || multiple || 2002–2021 || 14 Apr 2021 || 115 || align=left | Disc.: NEAT || 
|- id="2002 WM8" bgcolor=#d6d6d6
| 0 ||  || MBA-O || 16.27 || 3.1 km || multiple || 2002–2021 || 09 May 2021 || 154 || align=left | Disc.: NEAT || 
|- id="2002 WH10" bgcolor=#E9E9E9
| 0 ||  || MBA-M || 17.95 || data-sort-value="0.76" | 760 m || multiple || 2002–2021 || 13 May 2021 || 68 || align=left | Disc.: NEAT || 
|- id="2002 WS10" bgcolor=#E9E9E9
| 0 ||  || MBA-M || 16.86 || 2.4 km || multiple || 2002–2022 || 27 Jan 2022 || 159 || align=left | Disc.: NEAT || 
|- id="2002 WR11" bgcolor=#E9E9E9
| 0 ||  || MBA-M || 17.0 || 1.2 km || multiple || 2002–2020 || 24 Jan 2020 || 88 || align=left | Disc.: LONEOSAlt.: 2006 SM19 || 
|- id="2002 WX12" bgcolor=#FFC2E0
| 2 ||  || APO || 19.8 || data-sort-value="0.39" | 390 m || multiple || 2002–2019 || 01 Aug 2019 || 102 || align=left | Disc.: LINEAR || 
|- id="2002 WQ13" bgcolor=#d6d6d6
| 0 ||  || MBA-O || 15.95 || 3.6 km || multiple || 2002–2021 || 14 Apr 2021 || 335 || align=left | Disc.: LONEOS || 
|- id="2002 WT17" bgcolor=#FA8072
| 4 ||  || MCA || 18.1 || 1.3 km || single || 77 days || 27 Jan 2003 || 23 || align=left | Disc.: LINEAR || 
|- id="2002 WX19" bgcolor=#fefefe
| 0 ||  || MBA-I || 18.3 || data-sort-value="0.65" | 650 m || multiple || 2002–2020 || 22 Mar 2020 || 94 || align=left | Disc.: NEATAlt.: 2015 TR266 || 
|- id="2002 WA20" bgcolor=#d6d6d6
| 3 ||  || MBA-O || 17.0 || 2.2 km || multiple || 2002–2019 || 30 Jan 2019 || 30 || align=left | Disc.: NEAT || 
|- id="2002 WH20" bgcolor=#fefefe
| 0 ||  || MBA-I || 18.04 || data-sort-value="0.73" | 730 m || multiple || 2002–2021 || 02 Dec 2021 || 149 || align=left | Disc.: NEATAlt.: 2011 BZ30 || 
|- id="2002 WT20" bgcolor=#d6d6d6
| 4 ||  || MBA-O || 17.6 || 1.7 km || multiple || 2002–2018 || 01 Nov 2018 || 20 || align=left | Disc.: Mauna Kea Obs. || 
|- id="2002 WW20" bgcolor=#E9E9E9
| 0 ||  || MBA-M || 17.48 || 1.3 km || multiple || 2002–2021 || 17 Apr 2021 || 84 || align=left | Disc.: NEAT || 
|- id="2002 WJ21" bgcolor=#d6d6d6
| 0 ||  || MBA-O || 16.6 || 2.7 km || multiple || 2002–2021 || 14 Jun 2021 || 102 || align=left | Disc.: NEAT || 
|- id="2002 WL21" bgcolor=#C2E0FF
| 4 ||  || TNO || 7.69 || 96 km || multiple || 2002–2021 || 11 Jan 2021 || 25 || align=left | Disc.: Mauna Kea Obs.LoUTNOs, cubewano (cold) || 
|- id="2002 WE22" bgcolor=#d6d6d6
| 0 ||  || MBA-O || 16.84 || 2.4 km || multiple || 2002–2021 || 21 Apr 2021 || 71 || align=left | Disc.: NEAT || 
|- id="2002 WL22" bgcolor=#fefefe
| 1 ||  || MBA-I || 18.9 || data-sort-value="0.49" | 490 m || multiple || 2002–2021 || 04 Mar 2021 || 43 || align=left | Disc.: NEAT || 
|- id="2002 WO22" bgcolor=#E9E9E9
| 0 ||  || MBA-M || 17.4 || 1.8 km || multiple || 2002–2020 || 08 Dec 2020 || 113 || align=left | Disc.: NEATAlt.: 2011 UC178 || 
|- id="2002 WQ22" bgcolor=#E9E9E9
| 0 ||  || MBA-M || 17.2 || 1.1 km || multiple || 2000–2021 || 12 Jun 2021 || 64 || align=left | Disc.: NEAT || 
|- id="2002 WS22" bgcolor=#E9E9E9
| 1 ||  || MBA-M || 18.3 || data-sort-value="0.65" | 650 m || multiple || 2002–2020 || 24 Jan 2020 || 40 || align=left | Disc.: NEAT || 
|- id="2002 WV22" bgcolor=#E9E9E9
| 0 ||  || MBA-M || 17.3 || 1.5 km || multiple || 2002–2020 || 19 Jan 2020 || 115 || align=left | Disc.: NEATAlt.: 2013 HQ81 || 
|- id="2002 WY22" bgcolor=#d6d6d6
| 0 ||  || MBA-O || 16.98 || 2.2 km || multiple || 2001–2021 || 11 May 2021 || 101 || align=left | Disc.: NEATAlt.: 2012 TG128 || 
|- id="2002 WC23" bgcolor=#E9E9E9
| 0 ||  || MBA-M || 17.9 || 1.5 km || multiple || 2002–2021 || 16 Jan 2021 || 72 || align=left | Disc.: NEAT || 
|- id="2002 WG23" bgcolor=#fefefe
| 0 ||  || MBA-I || 17.3 || 1.0 km || multiple || 2002–2020 || 15 Dec 2020 || 197 || align=left | Disc.: NEATAlt.: 2011 FK100, 2012 QV12, 2015 KV20 || 
|- id="2002 WJ23" bgcolor=#d6d6d6
| 2 ||  || MBA-O || 17.4 || 1.8 km || multiple || 2002–2017 || 15 Nov 2017 || 55 || align=left | Disc.: NEAT || 
|- id="2002 WN23" bgcolor=#E9E9E9
| 0 ||  || MBA-M || 17.10 || 1.6 km || multiple || 2000–2021 || 14 Apr 2021 || 194 || align=left | Disc.: NEATAlt.: 2011 YX30, 2014 OA278 || 
|- id="2002 WO23" bgcolor=#d6d6d6
| 0 ||  || MBA-O || 16.7 || 2.5 km || multiple || 2002–2020 || 21 May 2020 || 89 || align=left | Disc.: NEAT || 
|- id="2002 WQ23" bgcolor=#E9E9E9
| 0 ||  || MBA-M || 18.1 || 1.0 km || multiple || 2002–2020 || 21 Jan 2020 || 50 || align=left | Disc.: NEAT || 
|- id="2002 WV23" bgcolor=#E9E9E9
| 0 ||  || MBA-M || 17.23 || 1.5 km || multiple || 2002–2021 || 09 Apr 2021 || 108 || align=left | Disc.: NEAT || 
|- id="2002 WW23" bgcolor=#E9E9E9
| 0 ||  || MBA-M || 18.38 || data-sort-value="0.89" | 890 m || multiple || 2002–2021 || 17 Apr 2021 || 35 || align=left | Disc.: NEAT || 
|- id="2002 WX23" bgcolor=#fefefe
| 0 ||  || MBA-I || 18.10 || data-sort-value="0.71" | 710 m || multiple || 2002–2021 || 09 Dec 2021 || 144 || align=left | Disc.: NEATAlt.: 2013 QR83 || 
|- id="2002 WJ24" bgcolor=#fefefe
| 0 ||  || MBA-I || 18.78 || data-sort-value="0.52" | 520 m || multiple || 2002–2021 || 07 Feb 2021 || 55 || align=left | Disc.: NEAT || 
|- id="2002 WN24" bgcolor=#d6d6d6
| 0 ||  || MBA-O || 16.79 || 2.4 km || multiple || 2002–2021 || 09 Nov 2021 || 176 || align=left | Disc.: NEAT || 
|- id="2002 WZ24" bgcolor=#E9E9E9
| 1 ||  || MBA-M || 17.8 || 1.2 km || multiple || 2002–2019 || 02 Nov 2019 || 73 || align=left | Disc.: NEATAlt.: 2006 TK131 || 
|- id="2002 WE25" bgcolor=#E9E9E9
| 0 ||  || MBA-M || 18.02 || 1.4 km || multiple || 2002–2022 || 27 Jan 2022 || 74 || align=left | Disc.: NEATAlt.: 2011 SV126 || 
|- id="2002 WH25" bgcolor=#d6d6d6
| 0 ||  || MBA-O || 16.08 || 3.4 km || multiple || 2002–2021 || 03 May 2021 || 137 || align=left | Disc.: NEAT || 
|- id="2002 WM25" bgcolor=#fefefe
| 0 ||  || MBA-I || 17.9 || data-sort-value="0.78" | 780 m || multiple || 1995–2021 || 12 Jan 2021 || 99 || align=left | Disc.: NEATAlt.: 2009 VA117 || 
|- id="2002 WU25" bgcolor=#d6d6d6
| 0 ||  || MBA-O || 16.60 || 2.7 km || multiple || 2002–2021 || 13 May 2021 || 79 || align=left | Disc.: NEATAlt.: 2011 LO3 || 
|- id="2002 WF26" bgcolor=#d6d6d6
| 0 ||  || MBA-O || 16.0 || 3.5 km || multiple || 2002–2021 || 01 Jun 2021 || 82 || align=left | Disc.: NEAT || 
|- id="2002 WM26" bgcolor=#E9E9E9
| 0 ||  || MBA-M || 17.77 || 1.2 km || multiple || 2002–2021 || 17 Apr 2021 || 119 || align=left | Disc.: NEAT || 
|- id="2002 WZ26" bgcolor=#fefefe
| 0 ||  || MBA-I || 18.38 || data-sort-value="0.63" | 630 m || multiple || 1998–2022 || 07 Jan 2022 || 56 || align=left | Disc.: NEATAlt.: 2013 TH101 || 
|- id="2002 WB27" bgcolor=#E9E9E9
| 0 ||  || MBA-M || 18.0 || 1.4 km || multiple || 2002–2021 || 16 Jan 2021 || 146 || align=left | Disc.: NEATAlt.: 2011 UL241 || 
|- id="2002 WF27" bgcolor=#E9E9E9
| 1 ||  || MBA-M || 18.1 || 1.0 km || multiple || 2002–2020 || 22 Jan 2020 || 95 || align=left | Disc.: NEATAlt.: 2006 SN133, 2016 AR69 || 
|- id="2002 WQ27" bgcolor=#E9E9E9
| 0 ||  || MBA-M || 17.89 || 1.1 km || multiple || 2002–2021 || 12 May 2021 || 58 || align=left | Disc.: NEAT || 
|- id="2002 WU27" bgcolor=#E9E9E9
| 0 ||  || MBA-M || 17.46 || data-sort-value="0.96" | 960 m || multiple || 2002–2021 || 10 May 2021 || 98 || align=left | Disc.: NEAT || 
|- id="2002 WN28" bgcolor=#E9E9E9
| 0 ||  || MBA-M || 17.1 || 1.6 km || multiple || 2002–2021 || 13 Jan 2021 || 71 || align=left | Disc.: NEATAlt.: 2015 VR28 || 
|- id="2002 WO28" bgcolor=#d6d6d6
| 0 ||  || MBA-O || 16.4 || 2.9 km || multiple || 2002–2021 || 07 Jun 2021 || 123 || align=left | Disc.: NEAT || 
|- id="2002 WT28" bgcolor=#E9E9E9
| 0 ||  || MBA-M || 17.53 || 1.3 km || multiple || 2002–2021 || 14 May 2021 || 121 || align=left | Disc.: NEATAlt.: 2015 XA363 || 
|- id="2002 WY28" bgcolor=#E9E9E9
| 0 ||  || MBA-M || 18.4 || data-sort-value="0.88" | 880 m || multiple || 2002–2021 || 12 Jan 2021 || 39 || align=left | Disc.: NEATAlt.: 2015 TO9 || 
|- id="2002 WO29" bgcolor=#E9E9E9
| 0 ||  || MBA-M || 17.76 || 1.2 km || multiple || 2002–2021 || 09 Apr 2021 || 122 || align=left | Disc.: NEAT || 
|- id="2002 WW29" bgcolor=#E9E9E9
| 0 ||  || MBA-M || 17.2 || 1.5 km || multiple || 2002–2021 || 17 Jan 2021 || 96 || align=left | Disc.: NEATAlt.: 2011 YF16 || 
|- id="2002 WZ29" bgcolor=#E9E9E9
| 0 ||  || MBA-M || 16.1 || 2.5 km || multiple || 2001–2021 || 03 Jun 2021 || 324 || align=left | Disc.: NEATAlt.: 2013 HA23 || 
|- id="2002 WC30" bgcolor=#E9E9E9
| 0 ||  || MBA-M || 17.79 || 1.2 km || multiple || 2002–2021 || 14 Apr 2021 || 68 || align=left | Disc.: NEATAlt.: 2015 XM342 || 
|- id="2002 WD30" bgcolor=#d6d6d6
| 0 ||  || MBA-O || 15.3 || 4.8 km || multiple || 2002–2020 || 23 Dec 2020 || 163 || align=left | Disc.: NEATAlt.: 2010 JE20 || 
|- id="2002 WR30" bgcolor=#d6d6d6
| 1 ||  || MBA-O || 17.1 || 2.1 km || multiple || 2002–2021 || 08 May 2021 || 37 || align=left | Disc.: NEAT || 
|- id="2002 WX30" bgcolor=#d6d6d6
| 0 ||  || MBA-O || 16.6 || 2.7 km || multiple || 2002–2018 || 12 Nov 2018 || 69 || align=left | Disc.: NEAT || 
|- id="2002 WY30" bgcolor=#fefefe
| 0 ||  || MBA-I || 18.0 || data-sort-value="0.75" | 750 m || multiple || 2002–2021 || 01 Feb 2021 || 99 || align=left | Disc.: NEAT || 
|- id="2002 WZ30" bgcolor=#d6d6d6
| 0 ||  || MBA-O || 16.60 || 2.7 km || multiple || 2002–2021 || 15 Apr 2021 || 142 || align=left | Disc.: NEAT || 
|- id="2002 WD31" bgcolor=#FA8072
| 0 ||  || HUN || 18.94 || data-sort-value="0.48" | 480 m || multiple || 2002–2021 || 30 Jun 2021 || 87 || align=left | Disc.: NEATAlt.: 2012 XJ80 || 
|- id="2002 WF31" bgcolor=#d6d6d6
| 0 ||  || MBA-O || 15.96 || 3.6 km || multiple || 2002–2021 || 10 Jun 2021 || 163 || align=left | Disc.: NEATAlt.: 2015 DO161 || 
|- id="2002 WK31" bgcolor=#E9E9E9
| 0 ||  || MBA-M || 17.4 || 1.8 km || multiple || 2002–2020 || 19 Nov 2020 || 104 || align=left | Disc.: AMOS || 
|- id="2002 WL31" bgcolor=#d6d6d6
| 0 ||  || MBA-O || 16.1 || 3.4 km || multiple || 2002–2021 || 12 Jun 2021 || 105 || align=left | Disc.: AMOSAlt.: 2010 DK98 || 
|- id="2002 WM31" bgcolor=#E9E9E9
| 1 ||  || MBA-M || 17.2 || 1.1 km || multiple || 2002–2020 || 08 Jul 2020 || 105 || align=left | Disc.: AMOS || 
|- id="2002 WP31" bgcolor=#C2FFFF
| 0 ||  || JT || 13.3 || 12 km || multiple || 2002–2020 || 18 Jul 2020 || 122 || align=left | Disc.: NEATTrojan camp (L5) || 
|- id="2002 WQ31" bgcolor=#E9E9E9
| 0 ||  || MBA-M || 17.1 || 1.6 km || multiple || 2002–2021 || 18 Jan 2021 || 164 || align=left | Disc.: NEAT || 
|- id="2002 WS31" bgcolor=#E9E9E9
| 0 ||  || MBA-M || 16.71 || 1.9 km || multiple || 2002–2021 || 04 May 2021 || 238 || align=left | Disc.: NEATAlt.: 2011 YM21 || 
|- id="2002 WT31" bgcolor=#FA8072
| 1 ||  || MCA || 18.7 || data-sort-value="0.54" | 540 m || multiple || 2002–2020 || 21 Mar 2020 || 47 || align=left | Disc.: NEAT || 
|- id="2002 WV31" bgcolor=#d6d6d6
| 0 ||  || MBA-O || 16.89 || 2.3 km || multiple || 2002–2022 || 06 Jan 2022 || 284 || align=left | Disc.: NEAT || 
|- id="2002 WX31" bgcolor=#fefefe
| 2 ||  || HUN || 18.5 || data-sort-value="0.59" | 590 m || multiple || 2002–2018 || 09 Dec 2018 || 66 || align=left | Disc.: NEATAlt.: 2010 TQ174 || 
|- id="2002 WY31" bgcolor=#E9E9E9
| – ||  || MBA-M || 18.1 || 1.0 km || single || 4 days || 02 Dec 2002 || 16 || align=left | Disc.: Mauna Kea Obs. || 
|- id="2002 WA32" bgcolor=#fefefe
| 0 ||  || MBA-I || 17.4 || data-sort-value="0.98" | 980 m || multiple || 2002–2021 || 08 Jan 2021 || 176 || align=left | Disc.: NEATAlt.: 2012 PE30, 2013 YN108 || 
|- id="2002 WC32" bgcolor=#fefefe
| 0 ||  || MBA-I || 18.0 || data-sort-value="0.75" | 750 m || multiple || 2002–2021 || 17 Jan 2021 || 68 || align=left | Disc.: NEAT || 
|- id="2002 WD32" bgcolor=#d6d6d6
| 0 ||  || MBA-O || 15.69 || 4.1 km || multiple || 2001–2021 || 10 May 2021 || 216 || align=left | Disc.: NEATAlt.: 2007 TU454, 2010 AR93, 2014 YX46 || 
|- id="2002 WE32" bgcolor=#fefefe
| 0 ||  || MBA-I || 18.91 || data-sort-value="0.49" | 490 m || multiple || 2002–2021 || 10 Apr 2021 || 50 || align=left | Disc.: NEATAlt.: 2015 RG20 || 
|- id="2002 WF32" bgcolor=#d6d6d6
| 8 ||  || MBA-O || 17.3 || 1.9 km || single || 15 days || 09 Dec 2002 || 10 || align=left | Disc.: NEAT || 
|- id="2002 WG32" bgcolor=#E9E9E9
| 0 ||  || MBA-M || 17.32 || 1.4 km || multiple || 2002–2021 || 10 May 2021 || 185 || align=left | Disc.: AMOSAlt.: 2015 XN30 || 
|- id="2002 WH32" bgcolor=#d6d6d6
| 1 ||  || MBA-O || 16.1 || 3.4 km || multiple || 2002–2020 || 01 Jan 2020 || 112 || align=left | Disc.: AMOSAlt.: 2009 AB4 || 
|- id="2002 WJ32" bgcolor=#d6d6d6
| 0 ||  || MBA-O || 16.37 || 3.0 km || multiple || 1994–2021 || 29 Oct 2021 || 183 || align=left | Disc.: AMOS || 
|- id="2002 WK32" bgcolor=#d6d6d6
| 0 ||  || MBA-O || 15.97 || 4.0 km || multiple || 2002–2022 || 15 Jan 2022 || 134 || align=left | Disc.: AMOSAlt.: 2010 HW70 || 
|- id="2002 WM32" bgcolor=#fefefe
| 0 ||  || MBA-I || 17.8 || data-sort-value="0.82" | 820 m || multiple || 2002–2020 || 15 Oct 2020 || 156 || align=left | Disc.: NEAT || 
|- id="2002 WN32" bgcolor=#fefefe
| 0 ||  || MBA-I || 18.1 || data-sort-value="0.71" | 710 m || multiple || 2002–2021 || 18 Jan 2021 || 106 || align=left | Disc.: NEAT || 
|- id="2002 WO32" bgcolor=#d6d6d6
| 0 ||  || MBA-O || 17.01 || 2.2 km || multiple || 2002–2021 || 29 Nov 2021 || 138 || align=left | Disc.: LPL/Spacewatch II || 
|- id="2002 WP32" bgcolor=#fefefe
| 0 ||  || MBA-I || 17.7 || data-sort-value="0.86" | 860 m || multiple || 2002–2020 || 20 Oct 2020 || 128 || align=left | Disc.: NEAT || 
|- id="2002 WQ32" bgcolor=#fefefe
| 0 ||  || MBA-I || 18.08 || data-sort-value="0.72" | 720 m || multiple || 2002–2021 || 08 May 2021 || 156 || align=left | Disc.: NEAT || 
|- id="2002 WS32" bgcolor=#fefefe
| 0 ||  || MBA-I || 18.08 || data-sort-value="0.72" | 720 m || multiple || 2002–2022 || 25 Jan 2022 || 54 || align=left | Disc.: NEAT || 
|- id="2002 WT32" bgcolor=#fefefe
| 0 ||  || HUN || 17.9 || data-sort-value="0.78" | 780 m || multiple || 2002–2021 || 15 Jan 2021 || 86 || align=left | Disc.: NEAT || 
|- id="2002 WU32" bgcolor=#E9E9E9
| 0 ||  || MBA-M || 17.60 || data-sort-value="0.90" | 900 m || multiple || 2002–2021 || 08 Jun 2021 || 81 || align=left | Disc.: LPL/Spacewatch II || 
|- id="2002 WV32" bgcolor=#fefefe
| 1 ||  || MBA-I || 18.0 || data-sort-value="0.75" | 750 m || multiple || 2002–2019 || 15 Nov 2019 || 75 || align=left | Disc.: NEAT || 
|- id="2002 WX32" bgcolor=#d6d6d6
| 0 ||  || MBA-O || 16.1 || 3.4 km || multiple || 2002–2020 || 28 Jan 2020 || 72 || align=left | Disc.: NEAT || 
|- id="2002 WY32" bgcolor=#d6d6d6
| 0 ||  || MBA-O || 16.7 || 2.5 km || multiple || 2002–2020 || 20 Jan 2020 || 40 || align=left | Disc.: NEAT || 
|- id="2002 WZ32" bgcolor=#E9E9E9
| 0 ||  || MBA-M || 17.2 || 1.1 km || multiple || 1997–2020 || 04 Jan 2020 || 38 || align=left | Disc.: NEATAlt.: 2010 JC196 || 
|- id="2002 WA33" bgcolor=#d6d6d6
| 0 ||  || MBA-O || 16.2 || 3.2 km || multiple || 2002–2021 || 07 Jan 2021 || 154 || align=left | Disc.: NEAT || 
|- id="2002 WB33" bgcolor=#d6d6d6
| 0 ||  || MBA-O || 16.3 || 3.1 km || multiple || 2002–2021 || 14 Jan 2021 || 81 || align=left | Disc.: LPL/Spacewatch II || 
|- id="2002 WC33" bgcolor=#d6d6d6
| 0 ||  || MBA-O || 16.93 || 2.3 km || multiple || 2002–2021 || 13 Sep 2021 || 58 || align=left | Disc.: NEAT || 
|- id="2002 WD33" bgcolor=#d6d6d6
| 1 ||  || MBA-O || 17.1 || 2.1 km || multiple || 2002–2020 || 22 Dec 2020 || 49 || align=left | Disc.: NEATAdded on 22 July 2020 || 
|- id="2002 WE33" bgcolor=#E9E9E9
| 1 ||  || MBA-M || 17.8 || data-sort-value="0.82" | 820 m || multiple || 2002–2020 || 15 Feb 2020 || 35 || align=left | Disc.: NEATAdded on 17 January 2021 || 
|}
back to top

X 

|- id="2002 XA" bgcolor=#FFC2E0
| 0 || 2002 XA || AMO || 19.49 || data-sort-value="0.45" | 450 m || multiple || 2002–2022 || 21 Jan 2022 || 467 || align=left | Disc.: LINEAR || 
|- id="2002 XB" bgcolor=#FFC2E0
| 0 || 2002 XB || ATE || 21.88 || data-sort-value="0.15" | 150 m || multiple || 2002–2022 || 05 Jan 2022 || 67 || align=left | Disc.: LINEAR || 
|- id="2002 XO1" bgcolor=#FFC2E0
| 4 ||  || AMO || 20.7 || data-sort-value="0.26" | 260 m || single || 91 days || 05 Jan 2003 || 43 || align=left | Disc.: LINEAR || 
|- id="2002 XE2" bgcolor=#E9E9E9
| 0 ||  || MBA-M || 17.85 || 1.1 km || multiple || 1998–2021 || 08 May 2021 || 93 || align=left | Disc.: LINEAR || 
|- id="2002 XF3" bgcolor=#fefefe
| 0 ||  || MBA-I || 17.8 || data-sort-value="0.82" | 820 m || multiple || 2002–2021 || 06 Jan 2021 || 153 || align=left | Disc.: LINEARAlt.: 2013 WP98 || 
|- id="2002 XN4" bgcolor=#fefefe
| 3 ||  || MBA-I || 17.5 || data-sort-value="0.94" | 940 m || multiple || 2002–2017 || 22 Nov 2017 || 24 || align=left | Disc.: Table Mountain Obs. || 
|- id="2002 XQ4" bgcolor=#E9E9E9
| 0 ||  || MBA-M || 17.8 || 1.5 km || multiple || 2002–2021 || 14 Jan 2021 || 111 || align=left | Disc.: NEATAlt.: 2011 WD67 || 
|- id="2002 XT4" bgcolor=#FFC2E0
| 6 ||  || APO || 24.0 || data-sort-value="0.056" | 56 m || single || 28 days || 28 Dec 2002 || 35 || align=left | Disc.: LINEAR || 
|- id="2002 XU4" bgcolor=#FFC2E0
| 3 ||  || AMO || 21.9 || data-sort-value="0.15" | 150 m || multiple || 2002–2020 || 26 May 2020 || 48 || align=left | Disc.: NEAT || 
|- id="2002 XW4" bgcolor=#FFC2E0
| 0 ||  || AMO || 21.69 || data-sort-value="0.16" | 160 m || multiple || 2002–2022 || 06 Jan 2022 || 60 || align=left | Disc.: LINEAR || 
|- id="2002 XZ4" bgcolor=#FA8072
| 0 ||  || MCA || 16.6 || 1.4 km || multiple || 1995–2021 || 15 Jan 2021 || 617 || align=left | Disc.: LINEARAlt.: 2005 JX145 || 
|- id="2002 XN6" bgcolor=#fefefe
| 0 ||  || MBA-I || 17.8 || data-sort-value="0.82" | 820 m || multiple || 2002–2021 || 18 Jan 2021 || 160 || align=left | Disc.: AMOSAlt.: 2009 UD88 || 
|- id="2002 XC8" bgcolor=#d6d6d6
| 2 ||  || MBA-O || 17.3 || 1.9 km || multiple || 2002–2019 || 07 Jan 2019 || 72 || align=left | Disc.: LINEAR || 
|- id="2002 XX8" bgcolor=#fefefe
| 0 ||  || MBA-I || 17.3 || 1.0 km || multiple || 2002–2021 || 08 Jan 2021 || 236 || align=left | Disc.: LINEAR || 
|- id="2002 XA9" bgcolor=#E9E9E9
| 0 ||  || MBA-M || 17.35 || 1.4 km || multiple || 2002–2021 || 07 Apr 2021 || 118 || align=left | Disc.: LINEAR || 
|- id="2002 XC11" bgcolor=#E9E9E9
| 0 ||  || MBA-M || 16.72 || 2.5 km || multiple || 2002–2022 || 27 Jan 2022 || 201 || align=left | Disc.: NEATAlt.: 2011 UF164 || 
|- id="2002 XO12" bgcolor=#E9E9E9
| 0 ||  || MBA-M || 18.3 || data-sort-value="0.92" | 920 m || multiple || 2002–2020 || 03 Feb 2020 || 67 || align=left | Disc.: NEAT || 
|- id="2002 XM14" bgcolor=#FFC2E0
| 3 ||  || AMO || 21.4 || data-sort-value="0.19" | 190 m || multiple || 2002–2018 || 10 Dec 2018 || 59 || align=left | Disc.: LINEAR || 
|- id="2002 XO14" bgcolor=#FFC2E0
| 5 ||  || APO || 22.1 || data-sort-value="0.14" | 140 m || single || 131 days || 25 Mar 2003 || 139 || align=left | Disc.: LINEAR || 
|- id="2002 XS14" bgcolor=#FFC2E0
| 5 ||  || APO || 24.2 || data-sort-value="0.051" | 51 m || single || 55 days || 30 Jan 2003 || 65 || align=left | Disc.: LINEARAMO at MPC || 
|- id="2002 XN15" bgcolor=#d6d6d6
| 0 ||  || MBA-O || 15.78 || 3.9 km || multiple || 2002–2021 || 07 Apr 2021 || 285 || align=left | Disc.: AMOSAlt.: 2013 ST84 || 
|- id="2002 XM18" bgcolor=#fefefe
| 0 ||  || MBA-I || 17.89 || data-sort-value="0.79" | 790 m || multiple || 1994–2021 || 03 Dec 2021 || 143 || align=left | Disc.: LINEAR || 
|- id="2002 XG19" bgcolor=#fefefe
| 0 ||  || MBA-I || 17.83 || data-sort-value="0.81" | 810 m || multiple || 2002–2022 || 04 Jan 2022 || 219 || align=left | Disc.: LINEAR || 
|- id="2002 XP19" bgcolor=#E9E9E9
| 0 ||  || MBA-M || 16.88 || 2.3 km || multiple || 2002–2022 || 25 Jan 2022 || 255 || align=left | Disc.: LINEARAlt.: 2011 SQ20 || 
|- id="2002 XW19" bgcolor=#fefefe
| 1 ||  || MBA-I || 18.3 || data-sort-value="0.65" | 650 m || multiple || 2002–2020 || 19 Jan 2020 || 121 || align=left | Disc.: LINEARAlt.: 2017 BN119 || 
|- id="2002 XU20" bgcolor=#E9E9E9
| 0 ||  || MBA-M || 17.35 || 1.4 km || multiple || 1999–2021 || 09 Apr 2021 || 110 || align=left | Disc.: LINEAR || 
|- id="2002 XJ23" bgcolor=#E9E9E9
| 0 ||  || MBA-M || 16.7 || 2.5 km || multiple || 2002–2021 || 09 Jan 2021 || 173 || align=left | Disc.: LINEAR || 
|- id="2002 XM24" bgcolor=#E9E9E9
| 0 ||  || MBA-M || 16.1 || 2.5 km || multiple || 2000–2021 || 07 Jun 2021 || 200 || align=left | Disc.: LINEARAlt.: 2010 MM104, 2014 SV4 || 
|- id="2002 XK27" bgcolor=#d6d6d6
| 0 ||  || MBA-O || 16.0 || 3.5 km || multiple || 2002–2021 || 13 Jun 2021 || 305 || align=left | Disc.: LINEAR || 
|- id="2002 XG31" bgcolor=#fefefe
| 0 ||  || MBA-I || 17.60 || data-sort-value="0.90" | 900 m || multiple || 2002–2022 || 27 Jan 2022 || 87 || align=left | Disc.: LINEARAlt.: 2013 WU46 || 
|- id="2002 XD34" bgcolor=#d6d6d6
| 0 ||  || MBA-O || 16.1 || 3.4 km || multiple || 2002–2020 || 22 May 2020 || 132 || align=left | Disc.: LINEAR || 
|- id="2002 XS34" bgcolor=#fefefe
| 0 ||  || MBA-I || 18.18 || data-sort-value="0.69" | 690 m || multiple || 2002–2021 || 15 Apr 2021 || 203 || align=left | Disc.: LINEARAlt.: 2014 EH15 || 
|- id="2002 XM35" bgcolor=#FFC2E0
| – ||  || APO || 23.0 || data-sort-value="0.089" | 89 m || single || 1 day || 02 Dec 2002 || 9 || align=left | Disc.: LINEAR || 
|- id="2002 XG36" bgcolor=#FFE699
| 1 ||  || Asteroid || 17.1 || 2.1 km || multiple || 2002–2019 || 05 Jul 2019 || 50 || align=left | Disc.: LINEARMCA at MPC || 
|- id="2002 XN37" bgcolor=#FA8072
| 0 ||  || MCA || 19.46 || data-sort-value="0.71" | 710 m || multiple || 2002–2022 || 06 Jan 2022 || 47 || align=left | Disc.: NEAT || 
|- id="2002 XT37" bgcolor=#E9E9E9
| 2 ||  || MBA-M || 17.0 || 1.2 km || multiple || 2002–2020 || 19 Jan 2020 || 53 || align=left | Disc.: AMOS || 
|- id="2002 XA38" bgcolor=#fefefe
| 1 ||  || HUN || 17.8 || data-sort-value="0.82" | 820 m || multiple || 2002–2021 || 06 Jan 2021 || 168 || align=left | Disc.: LINEARAlt.: 2006 ER70 || 
|- id="2002 XX38" bgcolor=#FA8072
| – ||  || MCA || 19.2 || data-sort-value="0.43" | 430 m || single || 17 days || 11 Dec 2002 || 17 || align=left | Disc.: LPL/Spacewatch II || 
|- id="2002 XE39" bgcolor=#FA8072
| 1 ||  || MCA || 18.3 || data-sort-value="0.65" | 650 m || multiple || 2002–2020 || 26 Jan 2020 || 41 || align=left | Disc.: NEAT || 
|- id="2002 XL39" bgcolor=#fefefe
| 0 ||  || MBA-I || 17.8 || data-sort-value="0.82" | 820 m || multiple || 2002–2021 || 17 Jan 2021 || 137 || align=left | Disc.: Desert Eagle Obs.Alt.: 2009 VR118 || 
|- id="2002 XW39" bgcolor=#FA8072
| 0 ||  || MCA || 20.35 || data-sort-value="0.36" | 360 m || multiple || 2002–2020 || 31 Jan 2020 || 167 || align=left | Disc.: LINEAR || 
|- id="2002 XY39" bgcolor=#FFC2E0
| 5 ||  || AMO || 21.6 || data-sort-value="0.17" | 170 m || single || 49 days || 29 Jan 2003 || 31 || align=left | Disc.: NEAT || 
|- id="2002 XB40" bgcolor=#FFC2E0
| 5 ||  || APO || 23.9 || data-sort-value="0.059" | 59 m || single || 18 days || 28 Dec 2002 || 28 || align=left | Disc.: LINEAR || 
|- id="2002 XC40" bgcolor=#FA8072
| – ||  || MCA || 19.1 || data-sort-value="0.64" | 640 m || single || 2 days || 12 Dec 2002 || 15 || align=left | Disc.: LINEAR || 
|- id="2002 XD40" bgcolor=#FA8072
| – ||  || MCA || 19.8 || data-sort-value="0.61" | 610 m || single || 3 days || 14 Dec 2002 || 19 || align=left | Disc.: LINEAR || 
|- id="2002 XF40" bgcolor=#FFC2E0
| 8 ||  || APO || 24.9 || data-sort-value="0.037" | 37 m || single || 3 days || 12 Dec 2002 || 13 || align=left | Disc.: LINEAR || 
|- id="2002 XK40" bgcolor=#E9E9E9
| 0 ||  || MBA-M || 17.7 || 1.6 km || multiple || 2002–2020 || 06 Oct 2020 || 105 || align=left | Disc.: NEAT || 
|- id="2002 XO40" bgcolor=#FFC2E0
| 6 ||  || APO || 20.7 || data-sort-value="0.26" | 260 m || single || 49 days || 29 Jan 2003 || 60 || align=left | Disc.: LINEARAMO at MPC || 
|- id="2002 XP40" bgcolor=#FFC2E0
| 0 ||  || AMO || 20.07 || data-sort-value="0.34" | 340 m || multiple || 2002–2022 || 27 Jan 2022 || 341 || align=left | Disc.: LINEAR || 
|- id="2002 XQ40" bgcolor=#FFC2E0
| 0 ||  || APO || 22.42 || data-sort-value="0.12" | 120 m || multiple || 2002–2022 || 26 Jan 2022 || 145 || align=left | Disc.: LINEAR || 
|- id="2002 XN41" bgcolor=#E9E9E9
| 0 ||  || MBA-M || 17.40 || 1.4 km || multiple || 2002–2021 || 14 May 2021 || 80 || align=left | Disc.: LINEARAlt.: 2016 AK82 || 
|- id="2002 XJ43" bgcolor=#FA8072
| 0 ||  || MCA || 19.79 || data-sort-value="0.33" | 330 m || multiple || 2002–2021 || 01 Oct 2021 || 100 || align=left | Disc.: NEAT || 
|- id="2002 XW44" bgcolor=#fefefe
| 1 ||  || HUN || 17.7 || data-sort-value="0.86" | 860 m || multiple || 2002–2019 || 08 Jan 2019 || 71 || align=left | Disc.: LINEAR || 
|- id="2002 XL45" bgcolor=#fefefe
| 0 ||  || HUN || 18.56 || data-sort-value="0.58" | 580 m || multiple || 2002–2022 || 07 Jan 2022 || 98 || align=left | Disc.: LINEAR || 
|- id="2002 XP45" bgcolor=#FA8072
| 1 ||  || HUN || 18.0 || data-sort-value="0.75" | 750 m || multiple || 2002–2021 || 13 Jan 2021 || 118 || align=left | Disc.: LINEAR || 
|- id="2002 XX45" bgcolor=#E9E9E9
| 0 ||  || MBA-M || 16.4 || 1.6 km || multiple || 1996–2021 || 14 Jun 2021 || 186 || align=left | Disc.: LINEARAlt.: 2015 WM2 || 
|- id="2002 XA46" bgcolor=#fefefe
| 1 ||  || HUN || 17.5 || data-sort-value="0.94" | 940 m || multiple || 1997–2021 || 14 Jan 2021 || 166 || align=left | Disc.: LINEAR || 
|- id="2002 XF46" bgcolor=#d6d6d6
| 1 ||  || MBA-O || 16.1 || 3.4 km || multiple || 2002–2020 || 15 Dec 2020 || 229 || align=left | Disc.: LINEAR || 
|- id="2002 XK47" bgcolor=#d6d6d6
| 0 ||  || MBA-O || 15.98 || 3.5 km || multiple || 2002–2021 || 17 Apr 2021 || 206 || align=left | Disc.: LPL/Spacewatch IIAlt.: 2013 XH8 || 
|- id="2002 XM53" bgcolor=#E9E9E9
| 0 ||  || MBA-M || 16.71 || 1.9 km || multiple || 2002–2021 || 01 Apr 2021 || 259 || align=left | Disc.: NEAT || 
|- id="2002 XO53" bgcolor=#d6d6d6
| 0 ||  || MBA-O || 16.1 || 3.4 km || multiple || 2002–2020 || 21 May 2020 || 148 || align=left | Disc.: NEAT || 
|- id="2002 XV53" bgcolor=#E9E9E9
| 0 ||  || MBA-M || 16.89 || 1.2 km || multiple || 2002–2021 || 30 Jul 2021 || 111 || align=left | Disc.: NEATAlt.: 2010 OF78, 2017 KJ41 || 
|- id="2002 XR58" bgcolor=#FA8072
| 0 ||  || MCA || 18.2 || data-sort-value="0.68" | 680 m || multiple || 2002–2020 || 21 Feb 2020 || 79 || align=left | Disc.: LINEARAlt.: 2006 UE183 || 
|- id="2002 XD65" bgcolor=#FA8072
| 1 ||  || HUN || 17.9 || data-sort-value="0.78" | 780 m || multiple || 1998–2021 || 13 Jan 2021 || 166 || align=left | Disc.: LINEARAlt.: 2012 QB || 
|- id="2002 XE68" bgcolor=#fefefe
| 0 ||  || MBA-I || 17.6 || data-sort-value="0.90" | 900 m || multiple || 2002–2021 || 17 Jan 2021 || 98 || align=left | Disc.: NEATAlt.: 2015 KB64, 2016 UL79 || 
|- id="2002 XV68" bgcolor=#FA8072
| 0 ||  || MCA || 17.7 || data-sort-value="0.86" | 860 m || multiple || 2002–2020 || 25 Jan 2020 || 96 || align=left | Disc.: LINEAR || 
|- id="2002 XY68" bgcolor=#E9E9E9
| 0 ||  || MBA-M || 16.9 || 1.8 km || multiple || 2002–2020 || 20 Apr 2020 || 268 || align=left | Disc.: LINEARAlt.: 2006 RJ102, 2014 RT60 || 
|- id="2002 XE84" bgcolor=#FFC2E0
| 2 ||  || APO || 21.3 || data-sort-value="0.20" | 200 m || multiple || 2002–2019 || 04 Dec 2019 || 59 || align=left | Disc.: LINEAR || 
|- id="2002 XR89" bgcolor=#d6d6d6
| 0 ||  || MBA-O || 17.18 || 2.0 km || multiple || 2002–2021 || 04 Oct 2021 || 61 || align=left | Disc.: VATT || 
|- id="2002 XN90" bgcolor=#FA8072
| 2 ||  || MCA || 18.9 || data-sort-value="0.49" | 490 m || multiple || 1960–2020 || 23 Jan 2020 || 52 || align=left | Disc.: Palomar Obs.Alt.: 4520 P-L || 
|- id="2002 XQ90" bgcolor=#FFC2E0
| 1 ||  || APO || 22.5 || data-sort-value="0.11" | 110 m || multiple || 2002–2019 || 08 Jan 2019 || 221 || align=left | Disc.: LINEAR || 
|- id="2002 XS90" bgcolor=#FFC2E0
| 7 ||  || ATE || 22.8 || data-sort-value="0.098" | 98 m || single || 16 days || 31 Dec 2002 || 17 || align=left | Disc.: LINEAR || 
|- id="2002 XT90" bgcolor=#FFC2E0
| 3 ||  || APO || 18.8 || data-sort-value="0.62" | 620 m || multiple || 2001–2007 || 10 Mar 2007 || 96 || align=left | Disc.: LINEAR || 
|- id="2002 XV90" bgcolor=#FFC2E0
| 7 ||  || APO || 25.5 || data-sort-value="0.028" | 28 m || single || 19 days || 01 Jan 2003 || 16 || align=left | Disc.: LINEAR || 
|- id="2002 XD91" bgcolor=#C2E0FF
| E ||  || TNO || 7.6 || 143 km || single || 1 day || 05 Dec 2002 || 3 || align=left | Disc.: Kitt Peak Obs.LoUTNOs, plutino? || 
|- id="2002 XE91" bgcolor=#C2E0FF
| 4 ||  || TNO || 5.89 || 280 km || multiple || 2002-2021 || 15 Jan 2021 || 56 || align=left | Disc.: Kitt Peak Obs.LoUTNOs, cubewano? || 
|- id="2002 XF91" bgcolor=#C2E0FF
| E ||  || TNO || 6.9 || 143 km || single || 57 days || 30 Jan 2003 || 5 || align=left | Disc.: Kitt Peak Obs.LoUTNOs, cubewano? || 
|- id="2002 XG91" bgcolor=#C2E0FF
| E ||  || TNO || 7.6 || 143 km || single || 1 day || 05 Dec 2002 || 3 || align=left | Disc.: Kitt Peak Obs.LoUTNOs, plutino? || 
|- id="2002 XJ91" bgcolor=#C2E0FF
| E ||  || TNO || 8.3 || 103 km || single || 1 day || 06 Dec 2002 || 3 || align=left | Disc.: Kitt Peak Obs.LoUTNOs, plutino? || 
|- id="2002 XL91" bgcolor=#E9E9E9
| 3 ||  || MBA-M || 17.1 || 1.1 km || multiple || 2002–2020 || 16 Mar 2020 || 63 || align=left | Disc.: Kitt Peak Obs.Alt.: 2006 XW21 || 
|- id="2002 XD92" bgcolor=#d6d6d6
| 1 ||  || MBA-O || 17.1 || 2.1 km || multiple || 2002–2021 || 08 Jun 2021 || 43 || align=left | Disc.: Kitt Peak Obs. || 
|- id="2002 XV93" bgcolor=#C2E0FF
| 3 ||  || TNO || 4.92 || 549 km || multiple || 1990–2022 || 24 Jan 2022 || 106 || align=left | Disc.: NEATLoUTNOs, plutino, albedo: 0.040; BR-mag: 1.09 || 
|- id="2002 XG95" bgcolor=#d6d6d6
| 0 ||  || MBA-O || 16.00 || 3.5 km || multiple || 2002–2021 || 12 May 2021 || 182 || align=left | Disc.: LINEARAlt.: 2012 PF7 || 
|- id="2002 XE96" bgcolor=#d6d6d6
| 2 ||  || MBA-O || 17.0 || 2.2 km || multiple || 2002–2020 || 15 Feb 2020 || 34 || align=left | Disc.: LINEARAdded on 11 May 2021Alt.: 2013 TC217 || 
|- id="2002 XG96" bgcolor=#fefefe
| 0 ||  || MBA-I || 17.81 || data-sort-value="0.81" | 810 m || multiple || 2000–2021 || 09 Apr 2021 || 148 || align=left | Disc.: LINEARAlt.: 2009 VP50 || 
|- id="2002 XK97" bgcolor=#E9E9E9
| 0 ||  || MBA-M || 18.0 || 1.1 km || multiple || 2002–2019 || 30 Dec 2019 || 63 || align=left | Disc.: LINEARAlt.: 2006 SJ136 || 
|- id="2002 XM97" bgcolor=#fefefe
| 0 ||  || MBA-I || 17.71 || data-sort-value="0.85" | 850 m || multiple || 2000–2021 || 14 Apr 2021 || 148 || align=left | Disc.: LINEARAlt.: 2009 XC24 || 
|- id="2002 XN97" bgcolor=#fefefe
| 0 ||  || MBA-I || 18.3 || data-sort-value="0.65" | 650 m || multiple || 2002–2020 || 12 Dec 2020 || 112 || align=left | Disc.: LINEARAdded on 17 January 2021 || 
|- id="2002 XG99" bgcolor=#d6d6d6
| 0 ||  || MBA-O || 15.90 || 4.5 km || multiple || 2002–2021 || 10 Apr 2021 || 150 || align=left | Disc.: LINEARAlt.: 2010 KJ112, 2013 VR3 || 
|- id="2002 XA102" bgcolor=#E9E9E9
| 0 ||  || MBA-M || 17.95 || 1.1 km || multiple || 2002–2021 || 17 Apr 2021 || 62 || align=left | Disc.: LINEAR || 
|- id="2002 XB102" bgcolor=#E9E9E9
| 0 ||  || MBA-M || 16.76 || 1.9 km || multiple || 2001–2021 || 08 May 2021 || 98 || align=left | Disc.: LINEARAlt.: 2018 RP11 || 
|- id="2002 XB104" bgcolor=#d6d6d6
| 0 ||  || MBA-O || 16.47 || 2.8 km || multiple || 2002–2021 || 16 Apr 2021 || 103 || align=left | Disc.: LINEARAlt.: 2010 AW99, 2010 MX133, 2015 FG131 || 
|- id="2002 XF104" bgcolor=#fefefe
| 1 ||  || MBA-I || 18.3 || data-sort-value="0.65" | 650 m || multiple || 2002–2019 || 28 Nov 2019 || 43 || align=left | Disc.: LINEARAlt.: 2017 BY96 || 
|- id="2002 XM104" bgcolor=#d6d6d6
| 1 ||  || MBA-O || 17.94 || 1.4 km || multiple || 2002–2021 || 06 Nov 2021 || 33 || align=left | Disc.: LINEAR || 
|- id="2002 XN107" bgcolor=#d6d6d6
| 0 ||  || MBA-O || 15.4 || 4.6 km || multiple || 2002–2020 || 24 Jan 2020 || 106 || align=left | Disc.: LINEARAlt.: 2010 DL28, 2010 PO52 || 
|- id="2002 XH109" bgcolor=#E9E9E9
| 0 ||  || MBA-M || 17.5 || 1.3 km || multiple || 2002–2020 || 25 Jan 2020 || 139 || align=left | Disc.: LINEAR || 
|- id="2002 XO113" bgcolor=#d6d6d6
| 0 ||  || MBA-O || 16.34 || 3.0 km || multiple || 2002–2021 || 12 May 2021 || 85 || align=left | Disc.: LINEAR || 
|- id="2002 XP114" bgcolor=#C2E0FF
| E ||  || TNO || 8.7 || 86 km || single || 1 day || 05 Dec 2002 || 3 || align=left | Disc.: Kitt Peak Obs.LoUTNOs, plutino? || 
|- id="2002 XM116" bgcolor=#d6d6d6
| 0 ||  || MBA-O || 17.77 || 1.6 km || multiple || 2002–2021 || 31 Oct 2021 || 29 || align=left | Disc.: La Palma Obs.Added on 5 November 2021 || 
|- id="2002 XE117" bgcolor=#E9E9E9
| 1 ||  || MBA-M || 18.0 || data-sort-value="0.75" | 750 m || multiple || 2002–2020 || 02 Feb 2020 || 65 || align=left | Disc.: NEAT || 
|- id="2002 XT117" bgcolor=#d6d6d6
| 0 ||  || MBA-O || 17.17 || 2.0 km || multiple || 2002–2021 || 02 Dec 2021 || 98 || align=left | Disc.: NEAT || 
|- id="2002 XL118" bgcolor=#d6d6d6
| 0 ||  || MBA-O || 15.9 || 3.7 km || multiple || 1994–2021 || 17 Jan 2021 || 166 || align=left | Disc.: NEAT || 
|- id="2002 XS118" bgcolor=#fefefe
| 0 ||  || MBA-I || 18.36 || data-sort-value="0.63" | 630 m || multiple || 2002–2022 || 07 Jan 2022 || 138 || align=left | Disc.: NEATAlt.: 2011 DT19 || 
|- id="2002 XC120" bgcolor=#E9E9E9
| 0 ||  || MBA-M || 17.5 || 1.8 km || multiple || 2002–2020 || 15 Dec 2020 || 99 || align=left | Disc.: NEAT || 
|- id="2002 XG120" bgcolor=#d6d6d6
| 0 ||  || MBA-O || 16.05 || 3.4 km || multiple || 2002–2021 || 08 Apr 2021 || 168 || align=left | Disc.: NEATAlt.: 2015 FB52 || 
|- id="2002 XL120" bgcolor=#E9E9E9
| 0 ||  || MBA-M || 17.99 || 1.1 km || multiple || 2002–2021 || 03 May 2021 || 72 || align=left | Disc.: NEATAlt.: 2015 XO20 || 
|- id="2002 XO120" bgcolor=#fefefe
| 2 ||  || MBA-I || 19.37 || data-sort-value="0.39" | 390 m || multiple || 2002-2921 || 13 Apr 2021 || 41 || align=left | Disc.: NEATAlt.: 2021 GX10 || 
|- id="2002 XQ120" bgcolor=#d6d6d6
| 1 ||  || MBA-O || 17.1 || 2.1 km || multiple || 2002–2019 || 10 Jan 2019 || 69 || align=left | Disc.: NEATAlt.: 2007 TY419 || 
|- id="2002 XT120" bgcolor=#fefefe
| 0 ||  || MBA-I || 18.23 || data-sort-value="0.67" | 670 m || multiple || 2001–2021 || 03 Dec 2021 || 101 || align=left | Disc.: NEATAlt.: 2010 XU93, 2017 OD63 || 
|- id="2002 XW120" bgcolor=#fefefe
| 0 ||  || MBA-I || 18.2 || data-sort-value="0.68" | 680 m || multiple || 2002–2020 || 14 Oct 2020 || 105 || align=left | Disc.: NEAT || 
|- id="2002 XY120" bgcolor=#fefefe
| 0 ||  || MBA-I || 17.8 || data-sort-value="0.82" | 820 m || multiple || 1998–2020 || 05 Nov 2020 || 131 || align=left | Disc.: NEATAlt.: 2013 XK9 || 
|- id="2002 XZ120" bgcolor=#d6d6d6
| 1 ||  || MBA-O || 17.0 || 2.2 km || multiple || 2002–2020 || 21 Apr 2020 || 48 || align=left | Disc.: NEAT || 
|- id="2002 XB121" bgcolor=#E9E9E9
| 0 ||  || MBA-M || 17.69 || 1.2 km || multiple || 2002–2021 || 14 Apr 2021 || 70 || align=left | Disc.: NEAT || 
|- id="2002 XG121" bgcolor=#fefefe
| 0 ||  || MBA-I || 17.3 || 1.0 km || multiple || 1991–2020 || 15 Dec 2020 || 124 || align=left | Disc.: NEATAlt.: 2016 WL11 || 
|- id="2002 XH121" bgcolor=#E9E9E9
| 1 ||  || MBA-M || 17.6 || data-sort-value="0.90" | 900 m || multiple || 2002–2020 || 02 Apr 2020 || 110 || align=left | Disc.: NEAT || 
|- id="2002 XJ121" bgcolor=#FA8072
| 0 ||  || MCA || 17.65 || data-sort-value="0.88" | 880 m || multiple || 2002–2021 || 09 Apr 2021 || 262 || align=left | Disc.: NEAT || 
|- id="2002 XK121" bgcolor=#fefefe
| 0 ||  || MBA-I || 18.16 || data-sort-value="0.69" | 690 m || multiple || 2002–2021 || 07 Apr 2021 || 80 || align=left | Disc.: NEATAlt.: 2012 RX2 || 
|- id="2002 XN121" bgcolor=#d6d6d6
| 0 ||  || MBA-O || 15.84 || 3.8 km || multiple || 2001–2021 || 15 May 2021 || 217 || align=left | Disc.: NEAT || 
|- id="2002 XQ121" bgcolor=#d6d6d6
| 0 ||  || HIL || 16.24 || 3.1 km || multiple || 2002–2021 || 13 May 2021 || 42 || align=left | Disc.: Kitt Peak Obs.Alt.: 2005 GQ229 || 
|- id="2002 XS121" bgcolor=#d6d6d6
| 0 ||  || MBA-O || 17.0 || 2.2 km || multiple || 2002–2020 || 13 May 2020 || 88 || align=left | Disc.: Kitt Peak Obs. || 
|- id="2002 XT121" bgcolor=#d6d6d6
| 0 ||  || MBA-O || 15.6 || 4.2 km || multiple || 2002–2021 || 01 Jun 2021 || 151 || align=left | Disc.: NEAT || 
|- id="2002 XV121" bgcolor=#fefefe
| 0 ||  || MBA-I || 17.7 || data-sort-value="0.86" | 860 m || multiple || 2002–2021 || 17 Jan 2021 || 94 || align=left | Disc.: Kitt Peak Obs. || 
|- id="2002 XW121" bgcolor=#fefefe
| 0 ||  || MBA-I || 17.7 || data-sort-value="0.86" | 860 m || multiple || 2002–2021 || 05 Jan 2021 || 242 || align=left | Disc.: NEAT || 
|- id="2002 XX121" bgcolor=#fefefe
| 0 ||  || MBA-I || 17.6 || data-sort-value="0.90" | 900 m || multiple || 1995–2021 || 08 Jun 2021 || 89 || align=left | Disc.: Kitt Peak Obs. || 
|- id="2002 XY121" bgcolor=#fefefe
| 0 ||  || MBA-I || 17.8 || data-sort-value="0.82" | 820 m || multiple || 2002–2021 || 06 Jan 2021 || 125 || align=left | Disc.: NEAT || 
|- id="2002 XB122" bgcolor=#d6d6d6
| 0 ||  || MBA-O || 17.0 || 2.2 km || multiple || 2002–2020 || 15 Jun 2020 || 63 || align=left | Disc.: Kitt Peak Obs. || 
|- id="2002 XC122" bgcolor=#fefefe
| 0 ||  || MBA-I || 17.8 || data-sort-value="0.82" | 820 m || multiple || 2002–2021 || 18 Jan 2021 || 71 || align=left | Disc.: NEAT || 
|- id="2002 XD122" bgcolor=#E9E9E9
| 0 ||  || MBA-M || 17.5 || 1.8 km || multiple || 2002–2020 || 10 Dec 2020 || 72 || align=left | Disc.: Kitt Peak Obs. || 
|- id="2002 XF122" bgcolor=#E9E9E9
| 0 ||  || MBA-M || 17.85 || 1.1 km || multiple || 2002–2021 || 07 Apr 2021 || 76 || align=left | Disc.: Kitt Peak Obs. || 
|- id="2002 XG122" bgcolor=#E9E9E9
| 0 ||  || MBA-M || 17.35 || 1.4 km || multiple || 2002–2021 || 02 Apr 2021 || 59 || align=left | Disc.: Kitt Peak Obs. || 
|- id="2002 XH122" bgcolor=#fefefe
| 0 ||  || MBA-I || 17.8 || data-sort-value="0.82" | 820 m || multiple || 2002–2021 || 12 Jun 2021 || 84 || align=left | Disc.: Kitt Peak Obs. || 
|- id="2002 XJ122" bgcolor=#fefefe
| 0 ||  || MBA-I || 18.1 || data-sort-value="0.71" | 710 m || multiple || 1995–2018 || 12 Apr 2018 || 47 || align=left | Disc.: SpacewatchAlt.: 1995 UV38 || 
|- id="2002 XK122" bgcolor=#fefefe
| 0 ||  || MBA-I || 17.9 || data-sort-value="0.78" | 780 m || multiple || 2002–2019 || 23 Oct 2019 || 66 || align=left | Disc.: NEAT || 
|- id="2002 XL122" bgcolor=#fefefe
| 0 ||  || MBA-I || 18.2 || data-sort-value="0.68" | 680 m || multiple || 2002–2020 || 09 Dec 2020 || 41 || align=left | Disc.: Kitt Peak Obs. || 
|- id="2002 XM122" bgcolor=#E9E9E9
| 0 ||  || MBA-M || 17.2 || 1.5 km || multiple || 2002–2020 || 15 Feb 2020 || 55 || align=left | Disc.: NEAT || 
|- id="2002 XN122" bgcolor=#fefefe
| 0 ||  || HUN || 17.9 || data-sort-value="0.78" | 780 m || multiple || 2002–2021 || 14 Jan 2021 || 97 || align=left | Disc.: NEAT || 
|- id="2002 XO122" bgcolor=#fefefe
| 0 ||  || MBA-I || 18.5 || data-sort-value="0.59" | 590 m || multiple || 1996–2020 || 17 Aug 2020 || 60 || align=left | Disc.: NEAT || 
|- id="2002 XP122" bgcolor=#d6d6d6
| 0 ||  || MBA-O || 16.5 || 2.8 km || multiple || 2002–2020 || 27 Feb 2020 || 77 || align=left | Disc.: Kitt Peak Obs. || 
|- id="2002 XQ122" bgcolor=#d6d6d6
| 0 ||  || MBA-O || 17.3 || 1.9 km || multiple || 2002–2018 || 18 Aug 2018 || 41 || align=left | Disc.: Kitt Peak Obs. || 
|- id="2002 XR122" bgcolor=#E9E9E9
| 0 ||  || MBA-M || 17.7 || 1.2 km || multiple || 2002–2021 || 16 Jan 2021 || 39 || align=left | Disc.: Kitt Peak Obs. || 
|- id="2002 XS122" bgcolor=#fefefe
| 0 ||  || MBA-I || 18.8 || data-sort-value="0.52" | 520 m || multiple || 2002–2018 || 18 Aug 2018 || 35 || align=left | Disc.: Kitt Peak Obs. || 
|- id="2002 XT122" bgcolor=#fefefe
| 0 ||  || MBA-I || 18.4 || data-sort-value="0.62" | 620 m || multiple || 2002–2020 || 26 Sep 2020 || 65 || align=left | Disc.: LPL/Spacewatch II || 
|- id="2002 XU122" bgcolor=#fefefe
| 1 ||  || MBA-I || 19.4 || data-sort-value="0.39" | 390 m || multiple || 2002–2020 || 19 May 2020 || 50 || align=left | Disc.: Kitt Peak Obs. || 
|- id="2002 XV122" bgcolor=#E9E9E9
| 0 ||  || MBA-M || 17.8 || 1.5 km || multiple || 2002–2020 || 14 Nov 2020 || 67 || align=left | Disc.: La Palma Obs.Alt.: 2006 SM414 || 
|- id="2002 XW122" bgcolor=#FA8072
| 1 ||  || MCA || 17.5 || data-sort-value="0.94" | 940 m || multiple || 2002–2021 || 15 Jan 2021 || 64 || align=left | Disc.: Kitt Peak Obs. || 
|- id="2002 XX122" bgcolor=#d6d6d6
| 0 ||  || HIL || 15.8 || 3.9 km || multiple || 2002–2017 || 22 Oct 2017 || 32 || align=left | Disc.: Kitt Peak Obs. || 
|- id="2002 XY122" bgcolor=#fefefe
| 0 ||  || MBA-I || 18.0 || data-sort-value="0.75" | 750 m || multiple || 2002–2021 || 24 Jan 2021 || 39 || align=left | Disc.: Kitt Peak Obs. || 
|- id="2002 XZ122" bgcolor=#d6d6d6
| 0 ||  || MBA-O || 16.81 || 2.4 km || multiple || 2002–2021 || 30 Jun 2021 || 39 || align=left | Disc.: Kitt Peak Obs. || 
|- id="2002 XA123" bgcolor=#d6d6d6
| 0 ||  || MBA-O || 17.1 || 2.1 km || multiple || 2002–2020 || 22 Mar 2020 || 54 || align=left | Disc.: Kitt Peak Obs. || 
|- id="2002 XB123" bgcolor=#fefefe
| 0 ||  || MBA-I || 18.4 || data-sort-value="0.62" | 620 m || multiple || 2002–2021 || 07 Feb 2021 || 37 || align=left | Disc.: Kitt Peak Obs. || 
|- id="2002 XC123" bgcolor=#d6d6d6
| 0 ||  || MBA-O || 16.6 || 2.7 km || multiple || 2002–2021 || 04 Jan 2021 || 85 || align=left | Disc.: Kitt Peak Obs. || 
|- id="2002 XD123" bgcolor=#fefefe
| 0 ||  || MBA-I || 18.3 || data-sort-value="0.65" | 650 m || multiple || 1995–2019 || 29 Nov 2019 || 100 || align=left | Disc.: LPL/Spacewatch II || 
|- id="2002 XE123" bgcolor=#E9E9E9
| 0 ||  || MBA-M || 17.3 || 1.9 km || multiple || 2002–2020 || 14 Nov 2020 || 72 || align=left | Disc.: Kitt Peak Obs. || 
|- id="2002 XG123" bgcolor=#d6d6d6
| 0 ||  || MBA-O || 16.67 || 2.6 km || multiple || 2002–2021 || 17 Apr 2021 || 66 || align=left | Disc.: Kitt Peak Obs. || 
|- id="2002 XH123" bgcolor=#E9E9E9
| 0 ||  || MBA-M || 17.6 || 1.7 km || multiple || 2002–2019 || 25 Sep 2019 || 60 || align=left | Disc.: Kitt Peak Obs. || 
|- id="2002 XJ123" bgcolor=#E9E9E9
| 1 ||  || MBA-M || 18.1 || 1.0 km || multiple || 2002–2019 || 02 Oct 2019 || 62 || align=left | Disc.: Kitt Peak Obs. || 
|- id="2002 XK123" bgcolor=#E9E9E9
| 0 ||  || MBA-M || 17.70 || 1.2 km || multiple || 2002–2021 || 03 May 2021 || 72 || align=left | Disc.: Kitt Peak Obs. || 
|- id="2002 XL123" bgcolor=#d6d6d6
| 0 ||  || MBA-O || 16.22 || 3.2 km || multiple || 2001–2021 || 01 Apr 2021 || 99 || align=left | Disc.: Kitt Peak Obs. || 
|- id="2002 XM123" bgcolor=#d6d6d6
| 0 ||  || MBA-O || 16.9 || 2.3 km || multiple || 2002–2020 || 22 Dec 2020 || 51 || align=left | Disc.: Kitt Peak Obs. || 
|- id="2002 XO123" bgcolor=#fefefe
| 0 ||  || MBA-I || 18.7 || data-sort-value="0.54" | 540 m || multiple || 2002–2019 || 02 Nov 2019 || 40 || align=left | Disc.: Kitt Peak Obs. || 
|- id="2002 XQ123" bgcolor=#d6d6d6
| 0 ||  || MBA-O || 17.26 || 2.0 km || multiple || 2002–2021 || 04 Aug 2021 || 74 || align=left | Disc.: Kitt Peak Obs. || 
|- id="2002 XR123" bgcolor=#fefefe
| 0 ||  || MBA-I || 18.5 || data-sort-value="0.59" | 590 m || multiple || 1998–2019 || 19 Sep 2019 || 85 || align=left | Disc.: Kitt Peak Obs. || 
|- id="2002 XS123" bgcolor=#fefefe
| 1 ||  || MBA-I || 18.5 || data-sort-value="0.59" | 590 m || multiple || 2002–2019 || 17 Dec 2019 || 45 || align=left | Disc.: Kitt Peak Obs. || 
|- id="2002 XT123" bgcolor=#E9E9E9
| 0 ||  || MBA-M || 17.6 || 1.3 km || multiple || 2002–2019 || 05 Oct 2019 || 34 || align=left | Disc.: Kitt Peak Obs. || 
|- id="2002 XU123" bgcolor=#fefefe
| 0 ||  || MBA-I || 18.2 || data-sort-value="0.68" | 680 m || multiple || 2002–2019 || 23 Sep 2019 || 36 || align=left | Disc.: Kitt Peak Obs. || 
|- id="2002 XV123" bgcolor=#E9E9E9
| 0 ||  || MBA-M || 17.74 || data-sort-value="0.84" | 840 m || multiple || 2002–2021 || 12 May 2021 || 73 || align=left | Disc.: Kitt Peak Obs. || 
|- id="2002 XW123" bgcolor=#fefefe
| 0 ||  || MBA-I || 18.6 || data-sort-value="0.57" | 570 m || multiple || 2002–2020 || 10 Dec 2020 || 33 || align=left | Disc.: Kitt Peak Obs. || 
|- id="2002 XX123" bgcolor=#fefefe
| 0 ||  || MBA-I || 18.57 || data-sort-value="0.57" | 570 m || multiple || 2002–2021 || 27 Nov 2021 || 70 || align=left | Disc.: Kitt Peak Obs. || 
|- id="2002 XZ123" bgcolor=#d6d6d6
| 0 ||  || MBA-O || 16.6 || 2.7 km || multiple || 2002–2019 || 19 Nov 2019 || 64 || align=left | Disc.: Kitt Peak Obs. || 
|- id="2002 XA124" bgcolor=#E9E9E9
| 0 ||  || MBA-M || 17.4 || 1.8 km || multiple || 2002–2020 || 10 Sep 2020 || 71 || align=left | Disc.: Kitt Peak Obs. || 
|- id="2002 XC124" bgcolor=#FA8072
| 1 ||  || MCA || 18.7 || data-sort-value="0.54" | 540 m || multiple || 1995–2019 || 03 Sep 2019 || 58 || align=left | Disc.: Kitt Peak Obs. || 
|- id="2002 XD124" bgcolor=#fefefe
| 0 ||  || MBA-I || 18.1 || data-sort-value="0.71" | 710 m || multiple || 2001–2020 || 10 Dec 2020 || 48 || align=left | Disc.: Kitt Peak Obs. || 
|- id="2002 XE124" bgcolor=#E9E9E9
| 0 ||  || MBA-M || 17.7 || 1.2 km || multiple || 2002–2019 || 25 Sep 2019 || 41 || align=left | Disc.: Kitt Peak Obs. || 
|- id="2002 XF124" bgcolor=#fefefe
| 0 ||  || MBA-I || 18.7 || data-sort-value="0.54" | 540 m || multiple || 2002–2019 || 05 Jul 2019 || 32 || align=left | Disc.: Kitt Peak Obs. || 
|- id="2002 XG124" bgcolor=#E9E9E9
| 0 ||  || MBA-M || 17.8 || 1.2 km || multiple || 2002–2021 || 17 Jan 2021 || 41 || align=left | Disc.: Kitt Peak Obs. || 
|- id="2002 XH124" bgcolor=#E9E9E9
| 2 ||  || MBA-M || 19.1 || data-sort-value="0.45" | 450 m || multiple || 2002–2018 || 07 Aug 2018 || 29 || align=left | Disc.: Kitt Peak Obs. || 
|- id="2002 XJ124" bgcolor=#fefefe
| 1 ||  || MBA-I || 19.0 || data-sort-value="0.47" | 470 m || multiple || 2002–2020 || 12 Dec 2020 || 26 || align=left | Disc.: Kitt Peak Obs. || 
|- id="2002 XK124" bgcolor=#C2FFFF
| 0 ||  || JT || 14.5 || 7.0 km || multiple || 2002–2020 || 23 May 2020 || 43 || align=left | Disc.: Kitt Peak Obs.Trojan camp (L5) || 
|- id="2002 XL124" bgcolor=#d6d6d6
| 0 ||  || MBA-O || 16.0 || 3.5 km || multiple || 2002–2020 || 22 Dec 2020 || 163 || align=left | Disc.: NEAT || 
|- id="2002 XM124" bgcolor=#d6d6d6
| 0 ||  || MBA-O || 16.28 || 3.1 km || multiple || 2002–2021 || 03 Apr 2021 || 112 || align=left | Disc.: Kitt Peak Obs. || 
|- id="2002 XN124" bgcolor=#d6d6d6
| 0 ||  || MBA-O || 16.74 || 2.5 km || multiple || 2002–2021 || 19 May 2021 || 103 || align=left | Disc.: Kitt Peak Obs.Alt.: 2010 CH258, 2010 PD82 || 
|- id="2002 XP124" bgcolor=#d6d6d6
| 0 ||  || MBA-O || 16.4 || 2.9 km || multiple || 2002–2021 || 11 Jan 2021 || 86 || align=left | Disc.: LPL/Spacewatch II || 
|- id="2002 XQ124" bgcolor=#d6d6d6
| 0 ||  || MBA-O || 16.96 || 2.3 km || multiple || 2002–2021 || 07 Jun 2021 || 52 || align=left | Disc.: Kitt Peak Obs. || 
|- id="2002 XR124" bgcolor=#d6d6d6
| 0 ||  || HIL || 15.91 || 3.7 km || multiple || 2002–2021 || 17 Apr 2021 || 65 || align=left | Disc.: Kitt Peak Obs. || 
|- id="2002 XT124" bgcolor=#fefefe
| 1 ||  || MBA-I || 18.8 || data-sort-value="0.52" | 520 m || multiple || 2002–2020 || 12 Sep 2020 || 37 || align=left | Disc.: Kitt Peak Obs. || 
|- id="2002 XU124" bgcolor=#fefefe
| 0 ||  || MBA-I || 18.17 || data-sort-value="0.69" | 690 m || multiple || 2002–2021 || 04 Oct 2021 || 56 || align=left | Disc.: LPL/Spacewatch II || 
|- id="2002 XV124" bgcolor=#fefefe
| 0 ||  || MBA-I || 18.2 || data-sort-value="0.68" | 680 m || multiple || 2002–2020 || 20 Dec 2020 || 111 || align=left | Disc.: LPL/Spacewatch IIAdded on 22 July 2020 || 
|- id="2002 XW124" bgcolor=#E9E9E9
| 0 ||  || MBA-M || 18.08 || 1.0 km || multiple || 1999–2021 || 07 Apr 2021 || 38 || align=left | Disc.: Kitt Peak Obs.Added on 9 March 2021 || 
|}
back to top

Y 

|- id="2002 YO2" bgcolor=#FFC2E0
| 5 ||  || AMO || 22.7 || data-sort-value="0.10" | 100 m || single || 64 days || 02 Mar 2003 || 78 || align=left | Disc.: LONEOS || 
|- id="2002 YT2" bgcolor=#FA8072
| 0 ||  || MCA || 18.52 || data-sort-value="0.59" | 590 m || multiple || 2002–2022 || 26 Jan 2022 || 112 || align=left | Disc.: Area 52 Obs.Alt.: 2017 WA26 || 
|- id="2002 YB4" bgcolor=#FA8072
| 0 ||  || HUN || 19.55 || data-sort-value="0.37" | 370 m || multiple || 2002–2019 || 29 May 2019 || 43 || align=left | Disc.: Bohyunsan Obs. || 
|- id="2002 YG4" bgcolor=#FFC2E0
| 6 ||  || APO || 24.0 || data-sort-value="0.056" | 56 m || single || 33 days || 30 Jan 2003 || 56 || align=left | Disc.: LINEARAMO at MPC || 
|- id="2002 YQ4" bgcolor=#d6d6d6
| 0 ||  || MBA-O || 15.39 || 4.7 km || multiple || 2002–2022 || 14 Jan 2022 || 182 || align=left | Disc.: LINEARAlt.: 2010 BG121, 2010 OA46, 2013 SE91 || 
|- id="2002 YR5" bgcolor=#FFC2E0
| – ||  || AMO || 22.5 || data-sort-value="0.11" | 110 m || single || 4 days || 04 Jan 2003 || 39 || align=left | Disc.: LINEAR || 
|- id="2002 YU7" bgcolor=#d6d6d6
| 0 ||  || MBA-O || 16.74 || 2.5 km || multiple || 1996–2021 || 03 May 2021 || 98 || align=left | Disc.: Bohyunsan Obs.Alt.: 2013 YA1 || 
|- id="2002 YB8" bgcolor=#E9E9E9
| 0 ||  || MBA-M || 16.5 || 2.1 km || multiple || 2002–2021 || 07 Jun 2021 || 423 || align=left | Disc.: LONEOS || 
|- id="2002 YL11" bgcolor=#fefefe
| 0 ||  || MBA-I || 18.18 || data-sort-value="0.69" | 690 m || multiple || 2002–2021 || 31 May 2021 || 99 || align=left | Disc.: Bohyunsan Obs. || 
|- id="2002 YC12" bgcolor=#FFC2E0
| 6 ||  || APO || 25.3 || data-sort-value="0.031" | 31 m || single || 7 days || 07 Jan 2003 || 42 || align=left | Disc.: LINEAR || 
|- id="2002 YD12" bgcolor=#FFC2E0
| 5 ||  || AMO || 21.7 || data-sort-value="0.16" | 160 m || single || 30 days || 30 Jan 2003 || 98 || align=left | Disc.: LINEAR || 
|- id="2002 YS12" bgcolor=#E9E9E9
| 0 ||  || MBA-M || 17.01 || 1.7 km || multiple || 2002–2021 || 17 Apr 2021 || 91 || align=left | Disc.: LINEAR || 
|- id="2002 YT12" bgcolor=#E9E9E9
| 0 ||  || MBA-M || 17.13 || 2.1 km || multiple || 2002–2021 || 08 Apr 2021 || 232 || align=left | Disc.: LINEARAlt.: 2014 QK70 || 
|- id="2002 YR13" bgcolor=#fefefe
| 0 ||  || MBA-I || 17.6 || data-sort-value="0.90" | 900 m || multiple || 2002–2021 || 05 Jan 2021 || 187 || align=left | Disc.: LINEARAlt.: 2009 SZ131, 2015 HK133 || 
|- id="2002 YQ17" bgcolor=#E9E9E9
| 0 ||  || MBA-M || 16.77 || 1.9 km || multiple || 2002–2021 || 30 Jul 2021 || 197 || align=left | Disc.: LINEAR || 
|- id="2002 YJ22" bgcolor=#fefefe
| 0 ||  || MBA-I || 17.91 || data-sort-value="0.78" | 780 m || multiple || 2002–2021 || 29 Apr 2021 || 116 || align=left | Disc.: LINEARAlt.: 2010 AX60 || 
|- id="2002 YR24" bgcolor=#E9E9E9
| 0 ||  || MBA-M || 16.3 || 3.1 km || multiple || 2002–2021 || 15 Jan 2021 || 245 || align=left | Disc.: LINEARAlt.: 2015 PK205 || 
|- id="2002 YD25" bgcolor=#d6d6d6
| 0 ||  || MBA-O || 16.14 || 3.3 km || multiple || 2002–2021 || 30 Apr 2021 || 100 || align=left | Disc.: LINEAR || 
|- id="2002 YC27" bgcolor=#E9E9E9
| 0 ||  || MBA-M || 16.7 || 2.5 km || multiple || 2002–2021 || 05 Jan 2021 || 217 || align=left | Disc.: LINEAR || 
|- id="2002 YQ28" bgcolor=#d6d6d6
| 0 ||  || MBA-O || 16.4 || 2.9 km || multiple || 2002–2020 || 27 Feb 2020 || 109 || align=left | Disc.: LINEAR || 
|- id="2002 YK29" bgcolor=#FFE699
| 1 ||  || Asteroid || 18.1 || 1.3 km || multiple || 2002–2020 || 20 Dec 2020 || 139 || align=left | Disc.: LINEARMCA at MPC || 
|- id="2002 YT32" bgcolor=#d6d6d6
| 0 ||  || MBA-O || 16.08 || 3.4 km || multiple || 2002–2021 || 09 May 2021 || 101 || align=left | Disc.: NEATAlt.: 2007 RU3 || 
|- id="2002 YW33" bgcolor=#E9E9E9
| 2 ||  || MBA-M || 17.6 || data-sort-value="0.90" | 900 m || multiple || 2002–2020 || 19 May 2020 || 51 || align=left | Disc.: LINEAR || 
|- id="2002 YH36" bgcolor=#d6d6d6
| 0 ||  || MBA-O || 16.2 || 3.2 km || multiple || 2002–2021 || 14 Jun 2021 || 98 || align=left | Disc.: La Silla Obs. || 
|- id="2002 YL36" bgcolor=#E9E9E9
| 1 ||  || MBA-M || 19.0 || data-sort-value="0.88" | 880 m || multiple || 2002–2017 || 03 Feb 2017 || 23 || align=left | Disc.: La Silla Obs.Added on 22 July 2020 || 
|- id="2002 YW36" bgcolor=#fefefe
| 0 ||  || MBA-I || 17.3 || 1.0 km || multiple || 2002–2021 || 18 Jan 2021 || 113 || align=left | Disc.: LPL/Spacewatch II || 
|- id="2002 YX36" bgcolor=#d6d6d6
| 0 ||  || HIL || 15.4 || 4.6 km || multiple || 2002–2020 || 23 May 2020 || 96 || align=left | Disc.: LPL/Spacewatch IIAlt.: 2010 BJ129 || 
|- id="2002 YY36" bgcolor=#d6d6d6
| 0 ||  || MBA-O || 16.70 || 2.5 km || multiple || 1995–2021 || 31 Oct 2021 || 85 || align=left | Disc.: LPL/Spacewatch II || 
|- id="2002 YZ36" bgcolor=#E9E9E9
| 0 ||  || MBA-M || 17.48 || data-sort-value="0.95" | 950 m || multiple || 2002–2021 || 11 Sep 2021 || 48 || align=left | Disc.: LONEOS || 
|- id="2002 YA37" bgcolor=#d6d6d6
| 0 ||  || MBA-O || 16.9 || 2.3 km || multiple || 2002–2019 || 08 Apr 2019 || 39 || align=left | Disc.: LPL/Spacewatch II || 
|- id="2002 YB37" bgcolor=#d6d6d6
| 0 ||  || MBA-O || 17.24 || 2.0 km || multiple || 2002–2021 || 08 Sep 2021 || 55 || align=left | Disc.: LPL/Spacewatch II || 
|- id="2002 YC37" bgcolor=#fefefe
| 1 ||  || MBA-I || 17.8 || data-sort-value="0.82" | 820 m || multiple || 2002–2021 || 15 Jan 2021 || 67 || align=left | Disc.: LPL/Spacewatch II || 
|- id="2002 YD37" bgcolor=#E9E9E9
| 0 ||  || MBA-M || 17.8 || data-sort-value="0.82" | 820 m || multiple || 2002–2020 || 27 Apr 2020 || 67 || align=left | Disc.: Piszkéstető Stn. || 
|}
back to top

References 
 

Lists of unnumbered minor planets